Golden Gate University School of Law (informally referred to as GGU School of Law, GGU Law and Golden Gate Law) is the law school of Golden Gate University. Located in downtown San Francisco, California, Golden Gate Law is a California non-profit corporation and is fully accredited by the American Bar Association (ABA) although it has received notice from the ABA that the school is not in compliance with  Standard 316, which requires accredited law schools to have a two-year bar pass rate of at least 75% or lose accreditation.

History

Golden Gate Law was founded in the autumn of 1901 as the YMCA Evening Law School, offering the first evening law program in the state of California. Like other YMCA law schools across the nation, it was established to provide full-time workers the opportunity to attend law school at night. The first graduating class in June 1905 had four male students.

As a component of the San Francisco Central YMCA, classes were held in the YMCA's five-story building at the northeast corner of Mason and Ellis Streets in the Tenderloin until it was destroyed in the 1906 San Francisco earthquake. After the earthquake, the school was conducted out of tents and later leased space at 1220 Geary Street, now Geary Boulevard, in the Western Addition.

On June 1, 1910, the school was incorporated as the "YMCA Law College" for the purpose of conferring LL.B degrees under authority of law. In November 1910, the Law College moved with the YMCA to its purpose-built home at 220 Golden Gate Ave in the Tenderloin. Law College's graduates enjoyed the diploma privilege from 1915 to its abolition in 1917.

In 1923, the Law College and the YMCA's local educational programs incorporated as "Golden Gate College," separating from the San Francisco Central YMCA. The college became fully independent of the YMCA in 1962. In December 1964, the school moved to its present location, a 1924 warehouse known as the "Allyne Building" at 536 Mission Street near 1st Street in the South of Market, with the rest of the college moving there in June 1968. In September 1966, the law school added a full-time three-year day program. Following the national trend, the school replaced the Bachelor of Laws with the Doctor of Jurisprudence on December 1, 1967, effective spring 1968.

The law school held provisional accreditation from the ABA from 1956 until full approval was granted in 1971. In 1972, the college elevated to university status and became "Golden Gate University," with "Golden Gate University School of Law" as its law school. A new "west wing" of the university was completed in 1979, where most of the school's classroom space is now located. In 2019, Golden Gate Law received notice that it was not in compliance with ABA Standard 316, which requires accredited law schools to have a two-year bar pass rate of at least 75% or lose accreditation.

Academics

Admissions
For the class entering in 2022, Golden Gate Law accepted 25.5% of applicants and 11.61% of those accepted enrolled with the average enrollee having a 154 LSAT score and 3.15 undergraduate GPA.

Degrees
The school offers the professional degree in law (J.D.) and advanced degrees in law (LL.M. and S.J.D.) programs in intellectual property, environmental law, taxation, U.S. legal studies, and international law.

Students also may earn combined degrees: J.D./M.B.A. with Golden Gate University's Ageno School of Business or J.D./Ph.D. with Palo Alto University.

Clinics and programs
In 1978, the law school developed a graduate legal program in taxation. In the 1990s, the school developed a graduate legal program in environmental law and the International Legal Studies Program. The law school's Public Interest Scholars Program includes the Environmental Law and Justice Clinic, Veteran's Legal Advocacy Center, and the Women's Employment Rights Clinic.

In 1994, the school's Environmental Law and Justice Clinic (ELJC) was founded. The ELJC provides pro bono legal support to low-income and minority communities suffering from pollution and environmental impacts. It has received numerous awards for its collaboration with grassroots, regional, and national groups in effecting change, most notably for bringing attention to the health disparities resulting from pollution concentrated in the Bayview Hunters-Point neighborhood of San Francisco. The ELJC's work with other groups and the City of San Francisco resulted in the closure of two power plants and the prevention of other power plants from being built in Bayview-Hunters Point.  In its third decade, the ELJC has focused attention on clean drinking water for low-income communities while also continuing its work to reduce air pollution and to support clients who have long made the connection between civil rights and environmental benefits and harms.

In 1998, the school established the Honors Lawyering Program through which students participate in two full-time, semester-long legal apprenticeships.

The school's clinics and programs are as follow:

 Pro Bono Tax Clinic
 Environmental Law & Justice Clinic (ELJC)
 Honors Lawyering Program (apprenticeships) (HLP)
 Summer Trial and Evidence Program (1st STEP)
 Veterans Legal Advocacy Clinic (VLAC)
 Women's Employment Rights Clinic (WERC)

Accreditation
The school has been provisionally or fully accredited by the American Bar Association (ABA) since August 1956. Golden Gate graduates qualify to take the bar exam in all 50 states and the District of Columbia. Golden Gate held only provisional accreditation from the ABA longer than any other in history, from August 30, 1956 until full approval was granted on July 6, 1971. In 2019, Golden Gate received notice that it was not in compliance with ABA Standard 316, which requires accredited law schools to have a two-year bar pass rate of at least 75% or lose accreditation.

The school has also been approved by the Committee of Bar Examiners of the State Bar of California in 1940. It is also a member of the Association of American Law Schools (AALS). On an institution-wide basis, Golden Gate University has been accredited by the Western Association of Schools and Colleges (WASC) since 1959. It was accredited by what is now the Northwest Association of Accredited Schools from 1950.

Bar passage rates
38% of Golden Gate graduates who took the California bar for the first time in July, 2021 passed, vs. a statewide average of 71% for first-timers and an 80% average for graduates of ABA-approved California law schools. Golden Gate ranked eighteenth and last among ABA-approved California law schools. In 2019, Golden Gate received notice that it was not in compliance with ABA Standard 316, which requires accredited law schools to have a two-year bar pass rate of at least 75% or lose accreditation.

Cost of attendance
The total cost of attendance (indicating the cost of tuition, fees, and living expenses) for continuing students at Golden Gate Law for the 2018-2019 academic year was $77,750.

Post-graduation employment 
According to Golden Gate Law's official 2020 ABA-required disclosures, 34.6% of the Class of 2019 obtained full-time, long-term employment in positions that required bar passage. 62.6% of the Class of 2019 obtained some form of employment within nine months of graduation, while 21.5% of graduates were unemployed and seeking employment.

Rankings
The law school is ranked #148-194 (bottom quartile) overall and #54-69 (bottom quartile) in part-time law by U.S. News & World Report.

In 2018, the law school received an "A+" in The National Jurist's rankings in the "Best For Diversity" category.

For three consecutive years between 2016 and 2018, Golden Gate University was ranked #1 in the nation for "adult learners" by Washington Monthly.

In 2005, the law school's Environmental Law Program was ranked #18 in the nation and #3 in California by U.S. News & World Report.

Notable people

Alumni
 Diana Becton (JD 1985), District Attorney of Contra Costa County (2017–present)
 Joan Blades (JD 1980), co-founder of MoveOn.org
 David Briley (JD 1995), 8th Mayor of Nashville, Tennessee (2018–19); Vice Mayor of Nashville (2015–18)
 Phillip Burton (LL.B. 1952), United States Representative (1964–83); California State Assemblymember (1957–64)
 Jesse W. Carter (JD 1913), Associate Justice of the Supreme Court of California (1939–59); California State Senator from the 5th district (1939–39)
 Morgan Christen (JD 1986), Judge of the United States Court of Appeals for the Ninth Circuit (2012–present); Associate Justice of the Alaska Supreme Court (2009–12)
 Peter Corroon (JD 1995), 2nd Mayor of Salt Lake County, Utah (2004–13); Chair of the Utah Democratic Party (2014–17)
 Gary W. Goldstein (JD 1978), author, speaker, filmmaker, and producer of Pretty Woman
 C. J. Goodell (LL.B. 1909), Associate Justice of the California Court of Appeal, First District (1945–1953)
 Cem Kaner (JD 1994), software engineering professor; co-founder of Association for Software Testing
 G. Randy Kasten (JD 1982), attorney and author
 Linda J. LeZotte (LL.M. 1983), Director of the Santa Clara Valley Water District (2010–present); San Jose City Councilmember (1998–2006)
 George Malek-Yonan (1964, attended), international attorney, politician, and athlete
 Bruce William Nickerson (JD), civil rights and gay rights attorney
 Cindy Ossias (JD 1983), lawyer and California Department of Insurance whistleblower
 Philip M. Pro (JD 1972), Judge of the United States District Court for the District of Nevada (1987–2015)
 Ira P. Rothken (JD 1992), high technology attorney and computer scientist
 Mike Terrizzi (JD 1981), community association lawyer and former Purdue quarterback
 Hanna Thompson (JD 2013), attorney and 2008 Olympics silver-medalist fencer
 Paul Traub (JD 1977), bankruptcy and business lawyer

Faculty
 Rebecca Bauer-Kahan, California State Assemblymember from the 16th district (2018–present), former law school professor
 Colin Crawford, 16th Dean of Golden Gate University School of Law (2021–present)
 George N. Crocker, Dean of Golden Gate University School of Law (1934–41)
 Thelton Henderson, Judge of the United States District Court for the Northern District of California (1980–present; inactive); associate law professor (1978–80)
 Gerald Sanford Levin, Judge of the United States District Court for the Northern District of California (1969–71) and San Francisco County Superior Court, law school instructor
 Andrew McClurg, law professor and legal humorist
 Shannon Minter, civil rights attorney and legal director of the National Center for Lesbian Rights
 Anthony Niedwiecki, Dean of Golden Gate University School of Law (2017–2020), former Vice-Mayor of Oakland Park, FL, co-founder of Fight OUT Loud
 Cecil F. Poole, Judge of the United States Court of Appeals for the Ninth Circuit (1979–97) and United States District Court for the Northern District of California (1976–80), United States Attorney for the Northern District of California (1961–70), law school instructor
 Donna Ryu, U.S. Magistrate Judge of the United States District Court for the Northern District of California (2010–present); clinical law school professor
 Carol Ruth Silver, Member of the San Francisco Board of Supervisors (1978–89); Freedom Riders and civil liberties activist; former law school professor
 Lidia S. Stiglich, Associate Justice of the Nevada Supreme Court (2016–present); adjunct law professor
 Caspar Weinberger, 15th United States Secretary of Defense (1981–87), 10th United States Secretary of Health and Human Services (1973–75), law school instructor
 Kandis Westmore, U.S. Magistrate Judge of the United States District Court for the Northern District of California (2012–present); adjunct professor of Honors Evidence
 Henry Travillion Wingate, Judge of the United States District Court for the Southern District of Mississippi (1985–2010), adjunct law school instructor (1975–76)

References

External links
 

Universities and colleges in San Francisco
ABA-accredited law schools in California
Educational institutions established in 1901
Golden Gate University
South of Market, San Francisco
Universities and colleges founded by the YMCA
1901 establishments in California
Law in the San Francisco Bay Area